Jan Elvheim  (8 July 1949 – 17 May 2019) is a Norwegian politician.

He was born in Vefsn to Johan Elvheim and Anne Hagen. He was elected representative to the Storting for the period 1989–1993 for the Labour Party. He also served as a deputy representative in 1985–1989 and 1993–1997.

Working as a seaman before settling as an industrial labourer in Harstad in 1971, he served in Harstad city council from 1979 to 1987.

References

1949 births
2019 deaths
People from Vefsn
People from Harstad
Troms politicians
Labour Party (Norway) politicians
Members of the Storting